The Canadian Shift is a chain shift of vowel sounds found in Canadian English, beginning among speakers in the last quarter of the 20th century and most significantly involving the lowering and backing of the front vowels. This lowering and backing is structurally identical to the California Shift reported in California English and some younger varieties of Western New England English, Western American English, Pacific Northwest English, and Midland American English; whether the similarly structured shifts in these regional dialects have a single unified cause or not is still not entirely clear. Similar, though not identical, changes to the short front vowels are attested in many English dialects, including RP, South African English, Australian English, Hiberno-English, and Indian English.

The back and downward movement of all the front vowels was first noted in some California speakers in 1987, then in some Canadian speakers in 1995
(initially reported as two separate phenomena),  and later documented among some speakers in Western and Midland U.S. cities born after 1980, based on impressionistic analysis. Assuming the similar chain shifts found in Canada and various parts of the U.S. are a phenomenon with a single common origin, a variety of names have been proposed for this trans-regional chain shift, including the Third Dialect Shift, Elsewhere Shift, Low Back Merger Shift, and Short Front Vowel Shift.

Canadian Shift in Canada

As each space opens up, the next vowel along moves into it. Thus, the short a  retracts from a near-low front position to a low central position, with a quality similar to the vowel heard in Northern England .

  
 According to Clarke et al. Hence, bet and bit tend to sound, respectively, like bat and bet as pronounced by a speaker without the shift.
 Labov et al.
He studied a diverse range of English-speaking Montrealers and found that younger speakers had a significantly retracted  and  compared with older speakers but did not find that the vowels were significantly lower. A small group of young people from Ontario were also studied, and there too retraction was most evident. Therefore, with Boberg's results, bet approaches but remains different from but, and bit sounds different but remains distinct.
 Hagiwara (2006), through acoustic analysis, noted that  and  do not seem to be lowered in Winnipeg, although the lowering and retraction of  has caused a redistribution of backness values for the front lax vowels.
 Sadlier-Brown and Tamminga (2008) studied a few speakers from Vancouver and Halifax and found the shift to be active in Halifax as well, although not as advanced as in Vancouver.

Due to the Canadian Shift, the short-a and the short-o are shifted in opposite directions to that of the Northern Cities Shift, found across the border in the Inland Northern U.S. and Western New England, which is causing these two dialects to diverge: the Canadian short-a is very similar in quality to the Inland Northern short-o. For example, the production  would be recognized as map in Canada but mop in the Inland North.

U.S. Third Dialect Shifts 

Most U.S. speakers with the cot–caught merger appear not to undergo the Canadian shift, in part because, typically in the U.S., the merged vowel is less rounded and/or less back and slightly lower than the Canadian vowel.

The California Shift in progress in California English contains the features of the Canadian Shift; the two phenomena may, however, be different, since in California the retraction of  has occurred even though Californian  is more centralized and less rounded than Canadian .

In Pittsburgh, where cot and caught are merged to a back rounded vowel, the mouth vowel  is traditionally a monophthong  that fills the low central space, thus preventing  from retracting. Among younger speakers, however,  begins to move backward as the monophthongization of  declines.

At the same time, historical  (the vowel in "lot") is merged with the  class. Also, the outcome of low back merger-like behavior is more like the California Shift outcome noted above than the rounded variant found in Canada.)

See also
California shift
Canadian raising
Northern Cities Vowel Shift
North-Central American English

Notes

Canadian English
Vowel shifts